George Mills (1 August 1916 – 17 December 1979) was a New Zealand cricketer. He played 59 first-class matches for Otago between 1935 and 1958.

See also
 List of Otago representative cricketers

References

External links
 

1916 births
1979 deaths
New Zealand cricketers
Otago cricketers
Cricketers from Dunedin
South Island cricketers